The Otomebora mullet (Planiliza melinoptera), the giantscale mullet or St Lucia mullet,  is a species of fish in the family Mugilidae. It is found in the Indo-Pacific Region.

References

Freshwater fish of South Africa
Taxa named by Achille Valenciennes
Fish described in 1836
Taxonomy articles created by Polbot
Otembora mullet
Taxobox binomials not recognized by IUCN